The Philadelphia Rage, were one of the eight original franchises of the American Basketball League (ABL), a women's professional basketball league. The franchise existed for just two-and-a-half seasons—1996-97 in Richmond, Virginia, 1997–98 and late 1998 in Philadelphia—the team produced many memorable moments for fans of women's basketball its highest level.

The Rage were led by the 1996 US Olympic team point guard, Dawn Staley, and by the less heralded but equally energetic play of Adrienne Goodson, who shot like a guard and rebounded like a power forward. With power forward Taj McWilliams, the Rage had three players out of the ten named to the 1997 All-ABL First and Second teams—the most of any team. The Rage scored a PR coup by signing the great heptathlete and long jumper Jackie Joyner-Kersee, probably the best-known player on any team, but the unofficial World's Greatest Female Athlete was more effective as a fan draw than she was on the court.  Their initial draft choice was Lisa Leslie, but she opted to sign with the WNBA instead.

Richmond Rage Team Record
Even without Leslie, the Rage had a strong first season. Although their win–loss record was 21-19  a full 10 games behind the 31-9 Columbus Quest, their record was good enough for second place in the Eastern Conference, and that was good enough to put them in the four-team playoffs. Matched in a best-of-three set against the top team in the Western Conference, the Colorado Xplosion, the Rage won two straight to advance to the finals against Columbus. In the best-of-five finals, the Rage jumped out to a 2-0 series lead, only to lose the last three games.

Philadelphia Rage Team Record
Despite fielding essentially the same team that went all the way to the finals, the relocated Philadelphia Rage did not do nearly as well in its second season, going just 13-31 and finishing fifth (dead last) in the East.

Last Season
Things were looking up for the Rage in season under new coach Anne Donovan.  They got off to a 9-5 start when the league suddenly folded on December 22, 1998. Less than a month later, on January 18, 1999 Rage reserve guard Katrina Price died of a self-inflicted gunshot.

All-ABL Rage Players

Dawn Staley (All-ABL 1st Team 1996-1997)
Adrienne Goodson (All-ABL 1st Team 1996-1997)
Taj McWilliams (All-ABL 2nd Team 1996-1997)

Dawn Staley (All-ABL 2nd Team 1997-1998)
Adrienne Goodson (All-ABL 2nd Team 1997-1998)

References

 
Basketball teams in Philadelphia
Defunct basketball teams in Pennsylvania
American Basketball League (1996–1998) teams
Basketball teams established in 1996
Sports clubs disestablished in 1998
1997 establishments in Pennsylvania
1998 disestablishments in Pennsylvania
Women's sports in Virginia
Women's sports in Pennsylvania